The women's canoe sprint K-1 200 metres at the 2012 Olympic Games in London took place between 10 and 11 August at Eton Dorney.

Competition format

The competition comprised heats, semifinals, and a final round.

Schedule

All times are British Summer Time (UTC+01:00)

Results

Heats
The six best placed boats in each heat advance to the semifinals.

Heat 1

Heat 2

Heat 3

Heat 4

Semifinals
The fastest two canoeists in each semifinal qualify for the 'A' final alongside the two fastest third placed boats. The last third placed boat alongside, the fourth and fifth placed boats and the fastest sixth placed boat qualify for the 'B' final.

Semifinal 1

Semifinal 2

Semifinal 3

Finals

Final B

Final A

References

Canoeing at the 2012 Summer Olympics
Olyp
Women's events at the 2012 Summer Olympics